A Little Bit of Stitt is an  album by saxophonist Sonny Stitt recorded in 1959 and originally released on the Roost label.

Track listing 
All compositions by Sonny Stitt except as indicated
 "When the Red, Red Robin (Comes Bob, Bob, Bobbin' Along)" (Harry M. Woods) - 2:48 
 "For All We Know" (Sam M. Lewis, J. Fred Coots) - 3:06
 "I'm Confessin' (That I Love You)" (Doc Daugherty, Ellis Reynolds, Al J. Neiburg) - 3:19 
 "Cocktails for Two" (Arthur Johnston, Sam Coslow) - 3:38 
 "Star Eyes" (Gene de Paul, Don Raye) - 3:39 
 "On a Slow Boat to China" (Frank Loesser) - 3:21
 "Laura" (David Raksin, Johnny Mercer) - 3:18 
 "J. B. Blues" - 3:56 
 "Don't Take Your Love from Me" (Henry Nemo) - 2:55 
 "After The Late, Late Show" - 3:56

Personnel 
Sonny Stitt - alto saxophone, tenor saxophone (tracks 3,6,8)
Jimmy Jones - piano
Aaron Bell - bass
Charlie Persip - drums

References 

1959 albums
Sonny Stitt albums
Roost Records albums
Albums produced by Teddy Reig